Karl Konrad Wilhelm Alexander Graf von der Groeben-Ponarien (31 August 1918 in Königsberg6 July 2005 in Baden-Baden) was a German entrepreneur.

Early life 

His family came from East Prussia. In World War II, he connected to the anti-Hitler resistance of the 20 July plot.

Career 

After the war, he acquired a distributor's license from the Coca-Cola Company. Through the Freudenberg Foundation, with which he was closely associated, he met the initiators of the later Amadeu Antonio Foundation.

In 1991, Graf founded with primar 250.000 D-Mark, a foundation, named after the 1990 murdered Amadeu Antonio Kiowa: the Amadeu Antonio Foundation. The foundation worked against far-right-wing parties, racism and anti-Semitism. The eponym was the Angolan Vertragsarbeiter (contract-worker), who was the first victim of racially-motivated violence after German reunification.

References

1918 births
2005 deaths
Counts of Germany
People from East Prussia
Members of the 20 July plot